The Monaca–East Rochester Bridge is a steel through continuous truss bridge which crosses the Ohio River between Monaca, Pennsylvania and East Rochester, Pennsylvania. It opened in 1959 and was tolled until 1973.  By the late 1970s, the segment of PA 51 from 17th Street in Monaca to its concurrency with PA 18 across the Monaca-Rochester Bridge was moved to its current alignment across the Monaca–East Rochester Bridge and its brief concurrencies with PA 65 and PA 68.

See also
List of crossings of the Ohio River

External links
List of major continuous truss bridges

Bridges over the Ohio River
Bridges completed in 1959
Continuous truss bridges in the United States
Bridges in Beaver County, Pennsylvania
Road bridges in Pennsylvania
Former toll bridges in Pennsylvania
Steel bridges in the United States
1959 establishments in Pennsylvania